The Gloucester 27 is  an American sailboat that was designed by Stuart Windley and Harry R. Sindle as a cruiser and first built in 1983.

The Gloucester 27 is a development of the 1979 Lockley-Newport LN-27.

Production
The design was built by Gloucester Yachts in the United States, starting in 1983, but it is now out of production.

Design
The Gloucester 27 is a recreational keelboat, built predominantly of fiberglass, with wood trim. It has a fractional sloop rig, a raked stem, a reverse transom, an internally mounted spade-type rudder controlled by a tiller and a fixed fin keel. It displaces  and carries  of ballast.

See also
List of sailing boat types

Related development
Lockley-Newport LN-27

References

Keelboats
1980s sailboat type designs
Sailing yachts
Sailboat type designs by Stuart Windley
Sailboat type designs by Harry R. Sindle
Sailboat types built by Gloucester Yachts